The  is a Grade 1 flat horse race in Japan for four-year-old and above thoroughbreds. It is run over a distance of 1,200 metres (approximately 6 furlongs) at Chukyo Racecourse in late March.

It was started as the  when the victory cup was designed by Prince Takamatsu in 1971, and was given Domestic Grade 2 status when race grading was introduced to Japan in 1984. It was run over a distance of 2,000 metres. This was shortened to 1,200 metres and elevated to Domestic Grade 1 in 1996, and to its present level in 2006. Horses trained outside Japan have been eligible to run in the race since 2001. It was renamed the Takamatsunomiya Kinen in 1998 because the family of Prince Takamatsu stopped designing the victory cup.

From 2011 The Takamatsunomiya Kinen has taken over from the Centaur Stakes as a Japanese leg of the Global Sprint Challenge Series it is the second leg of the series preceded by the Lightning Stakes and from 2012 followed by the Dubai Golden Shaheen

It is also the only JRA Grade 1 race not held at one of the 4 major racecourses: (Hanshin, Kyoto, Nakayama, Tokyo).

Winners since 1996

* The 2011 race took place at Hanshin Racecourse.

Past winners

1971: Shunsakuo
1972: Josetsu
1973: Takeden Bird
1974: Haiseiko
1975: Itto 
1976: Fujino Parthia
1977: Tosho Boy 
1978: Yamanin Goro
1979: Nehai Jet
1980: Lindo Pleben
1981: Hagino Top Lady
1982: Kazushige
1983: Hagino Kamui O
1984: Kyoei Rare
1985: Mejiro Mont Cenis
1986: Rugby Ball
1987: Land Hiryu
1988: Oguri Cap
1989: Mejiro Ardan
1990: Bamboo Memory
1991: Daitaku Helios
1992: Mr. Spain
1993: Longchamp Boy
1994: Nice Nature
1995: Matikanetannhauser

See also
 Horse racing in Japan
 List of Japanese flat horse races

References 

Racing Post: 

External links 
 Horse Racing in Japan

Open sprint category horse races
Horse races in Japan
Turf races in Japan